Roseivirga marina is a Gram-negative and rod-shaped bacterium from the genus of Roseivirga which has been isolated from seawater from the Sea of Japan.

References

Cytophagia
Bacteria described in 2015